The 1932 Palestine Cup (HaGavia HaEretz-Israeli) was the fourth season of Israeli Football Association's nationwide football cup competition. The defending holders were Maccabi Tel Aviv (B).

For the first time in 5 years, and the first time since the founding of the Eretz Israel Football Association, a British team, British Police, won the cup, completing a double, as the team also won the league.

In the final, held in Petah Tikva, British Police met Hapoel Haifa. The match was abandoned at the 38th minute, with the score at 1–0 to Hapoel Haifa, and was awarded to the Policemen.

Results

First round

Replay

Quarter-finals

Semi-finals

Final

References
100 Years of Football 1906-2006, Elisha Shohat (Israel), 2006

External links
 Israel Football Association website 

Israel State Cup
Cup
Israel State Cup seasons